{{DISPLAYTITLE:Vitamin B12 total synthesis}}
The total synthesis of the complex biomolecule vitamin B12 was accomplished in two different approaches by the collaborating research groups of Robert Burns Woodward at Harvard and Albert Eschenmoser at ETH in 1972. The accomplishment required the effort of no less than 91 postdoctoral researchers (Harvard: 77, ETH: 14), and 12 Ph.D. students (at ETH) from 19 different nations over a period of almost 12 years. The synthesis project induced and involved a major change of paradigm in the field of natural product synthesis.

The molecule

Vitamin B12, C63H88CoN14O14P, is the most complex of all known vitamins. Its chemical structure had been determined by x-ray crystal structure analysis in 1956 by the research group of Dorothy Hodgkin (Oxford University) in collaboration with Kenneth N. Trueblood at UCLA and John G. White at Princeton University.
Core of the molecule is the corrin structure, a nitrogenous tetradentate ligand system. This is biogenetically related to porphyrins and chlorophylls, yet differs from them in important respects: the carbon skeleton lacks one of the four meso carbons between the five-membered rings, two rings (A and D, fig. 1) being directly connected by a carbon-carbon single bond. The corrin chromophore system is thus non-cyclic and expands over three meso positions only, incorporating three vinylogous amidine units. Lined up at the periphery of the macrocyclic ring are eight methyl groups and four propionic and three acetic acid side chains. Nine carbon atoms on the corrin periphery are chirogenic centers. The tetradentate, monobasic corrin ligand is equatorially coordinated with a trivalent cobalt ion which bears two additional axial ligands.

Several natural variants of the B12 structure exist that differ in these axial ligands. In the vitamin itself, the cobalt bears a cyano group on the top side of the corrin plane (cyanocobalamin), and a nucleotide loop on the other. This loop is connected on its other end to the peripheral propionic amide group at ring D and consists of structural elements derived from aminopropanol, phosphate, ribose, and 5,6-dimethylbenzimidazole. One of the nitrogen atoms of the imidazole ring is axially coordinated to the cobalt, the nucleotide loop thus forming a nineteen-membered ring. All side chain carboxyl groups are amides.

Cobyric acid, one of the natural derivatives of vitamin B12, lacks the nucleotide loop; depending on the nature of the two axial ligands, it displays instead its propionic acid function at ring D as carboxylate (as shown in fig. 1), or carboxylic acid (with two cyanide ligands at cobalt).

The two syntheses

The structure of vitamin B12 was the first low-molecular weight natural product determined by x-ray analysis rather than by chemical degradation. Thus, while the structure of this novel type of complex biomolecule was established, its chemistry remained essentially unknown; exploration of this chemistry became one of the tasks of the vitamin's chemical synthesis. In the 1960s, synthesis of such an exceptionally complex and unique structure presented the major challenge at the frontier of research in organic natural product synthesis.

Already in 1960, the research group of the biochemist  in Stuttgart had reconstituted vitamin B12 from one of its naturally occurring derivatives, cobyric acid, by stepwise construction of the vitamin's nucleotide loop. This work amounted to a partial synthesis of vitamin B12 from a natural product containing all the structural elements of vitamin B12 except the nucleotide loop. Therefore, cobyric acid was chosen as the target molecule for a total synthesis of vitamin B12.

Collaborative work of research groups at Harvard and at ETH resulted in two cobyric acid syntheses, both concomitantly accomplished in 1972, one at Harvard, and the other at ETH. A "competitive collaboration" of that size, involving 103 graduate students and postdoctoral researchers for a total almost 177 person-years, is so far unique in the history of organic synthesis. The two syntheses are intricately intertwined chemically, yet they differ basically in the way the central macrocyclic corrin ligand system is constructed. Both strategies are patterned after two model corrin syntheses developed at ETH. The first, published in 1964, achieved the construction of the corrin chromophore by combining an A-D-component with a B-C-component via iminoester/enamine-C,C-condensations, the final corrin-ring closure being attained between rings A and B. The second model synthesis, published 1969, explored a novel photochemical cycloisomerization process to create the direct A/D-ring junction as final corrin-ring closure between rings A and D.

The A/B approach to the cobyric acid syntheses was collaboratively pursued and accomplished in 1972 at Harvard. It combined a bicyclic Harvard A-D-component with an ETH B-C-component, and closed the macrocyclic corrin ring between rings A and B. The A/D approach to the synthesis, accomplished at ETH and finished at the same time as the A/B approach also in 1972, successively adds rings D and A to the B-C-component of the A/B approach and attains the corrin ring closure between rings A and D. The paths of the two syntheses met in a common corrinoid intermediate. The final steps from this intermediate to cobyric acid were carried out in the two laboratories again collaboratively, each group working with material prepared via their own approach, respectively.

Synopsis of the Harvard/ETH collaboration

The beginnings

Woodward and Eschenmoser embarked on the project of a chemical synthesis of vitamin B12 independently from each other. The ETH group started with a model study on how to synthesize a corrin ligand system in December 1959. In August 1961, the Harvard group began attacking the buildup of the B12 structure directly by aiming at the most complex part of the B12 molecule, the "western half" that contains the direct junction between rings A und D (the A-D-component). Already in October 1960, the ETH group had commenced the synthesis of a ring-B precursor of vitamin B12.

At the beginning, progress at Harvard was rapid, until an unexpected stereochemical course of a central ring formation step interrupted the project. Woodward's recognition of the stereochemical enigma that came to light by the irritating behavior of one of his carefully planned synthetic steps became, according to his own writings, part of the developments that led to the orbital symmetry rules.

After 1965, the Harvard group continued work towards an A-D-component along a modified plan, using (−)-camphor as the source of ring D.

Joining forces: the A/B approach to cobyric acid synthesis

By 1964, the ETH group had accomplished the first corrin model synthesis, and also the preparation of a ring-B precursor as part of a construction of the B12 molecule itself. Since independent progress of the two groups towards their long-term objective was so clearly complementary, Woodward and Eschenmoser decided in 1965 to join forces and to pursue from then on the project of a B12 synthesis collaboratively, planning to utilize the ligand construction (ring coupling of components) strategy of the ETH model system.

By 1966, the ETH group had succeeded in synthesizing the B-C-component ("eastern half") by coupling their ring-B precursor to the ring-C precursor. The latter had also been prepared at Harvard from (−)-camphor by a strategy conceived and used earlier by A. Pelter and J. W. Cornforth in 1961. At ETH, the synthesis of the B-C-component involved the implementation of the C,C-condensation reaction via sulfide contraction. This newly developed method turned out to provide a general solution to the problem of constructing the characteristic structural elements of the corrin chromophore, the vinylogous amidine systems bridging the four peripheral rings.
 

Early in 1967, the Harvard group accomplished the synthesis of the model A-D-component, with the f-side chain undifferentiated, bearing a methyl ester function like all other side chains. From then on, the two groups systematically exchanged samples of their respective halves of the corrinoid target structure. By 1970, they had collaboratively connected Harvard's undifferentiated A-D-component with ETH's B-C-component, producing dicyano-cobalt(III)-5,15-bisnor-heptamethyl-cobyrinate 1 (fig. 4). The ETH group identified this totally synthetic corrinoid intermediate by direct comparison with a sample produced from natural vitamin B12.

In this advanced model study, reaction conditions for the demanding processes of the C/D-coupling and the A/B-cyclization via sulfide contraction method were established. Those for the C/D-coupling were successfully explored in both laboratories, the superior conditions were those found at Harvard, while the method for the A/B-ring closure via an intramolecular version of the sulfide contraction was developed at ETH. Later it was shown at Harvard that the A/B-ring closure could also be achieved by thio-iminoester/enamine condensation.

By early 1971, the Harvard group had accomplished the synthesis of the final A-D-component, containing the f-side chain carboxyl function at ring D differentiated from all the carboxyl functions as a nitrile group (as shown in 2 in fig. 4; see also fig. 3). The A/D-part of the B12 structure incorporates the constitutionally and configurationally most intricate part of the vitamin molecule; its synthesis is regarded as the apotheosis of the Woodwardian art in natural product total synthesis.

The alternative approach to cobyric acid synthesis

As far back as 1966, the ETH group had started to explore, once again in a model system, an alternative strategy of corrin synthesis in which the corrin ring would be closed between rings A and D. The project was inspired by the conceivable existence of a thus far unknown bond reorganisation process. This  if existing  would make possible the construction of cobyric acid from one single starting material. Importantly, the hypothetical process, being interpreted as implying two sequential rearrangements, was recognized to be formally covered by the new reactivity classifications of sigmatropic rearrangements and electrocyclizations propounded by Woodward and Hoffmann in the context of their orbital symmetry rules!

By May 1968, the ETH group had demonstrated in a model study that the envisaged process, a photochemical A/D-seco-corrinate→corrinate cycloisomerization, does in fact exist. This process was first found to proceed with the Pd complex, but not at all with corresponding Ni(II)- or cobalt(III)-A/D-seco-corrinate complexes. It also went smoothly in complexes of metal ions such as zinc and other photochemically inert and loosely bound metal ions. These, after ring closure, could easily be replaced by cobalt. These discoveries opened the door to what eventually became the photochemical A/D approach of cobyric acid synthesis.

Starting in fall of 1969 with the B-C-component of the A/B approach and a ring-D precursor prepared from the enantiomer of the starting material leading to the ring-B precursor, it took PhD student Walter Fuhrer less than one and a half years to translate the photochemical model corrin synthesis into a synthesis of dicyano-cobalt(III)-5,15-bisnor-a,b,d,e,g-pentamethyl-cobyrinate-c-N,N-dimethylamide-f-nitrile 2 (fig. 4), the common corrinoid intermediate on the way to cobyric acid. At Harvard, the very same intermediate 2 was obtained around the same time by coupling the ring-D differentiated Harvard A-D-component (available in spring 1971) with the ETH B-C-component, applying the condensation methods developed earlier using the undifferentiated A-D-component.

Thus, in spring 1971, two different routes to a common corrinoid intermediate 2 (fig. 4) along the way to cobyric acid had become available, one requiring 62 chemical steps (Harvard/ETH A/B approach), the other 42 (ETH A/D approach). In both approaches, the four peripheral rings derived from enantiopure precursors possessing the correct sense of chiral, thereby circumventing major stereochemical problems in the buildup of the ligand system. In the construction of the A/D-junction by the A/D-secocorrin→corrin cycloisomerization, formation of two A/D-diastereomers had to be expected. Using cadmium(II) as the coordinating metal ion led to a very high diastereoselectivity in favor of the natural A/D-trans-isomer.

Once the corrin structure was formed by either approach, the three C-H-chirogenic centers at the periphery adjacent to the chromophore system turned out to be prone to epimerizations with exceptional ease. This required a separation of diastereomers after most of the chemical steps in this advanced stage of the syntheses. It was fortunate indeed that, just around that time, the technique of high pressure liquid chromatography (HPLC) had been developed in analytical chemistry. HPLC became an indispensable tool in both laboratories; its use in the B12 project, pioneered by Jakob Schreiber at ETH, was the earliest application of the technique in natural product synthesis.

The joint final steps

The final conversion of the common corrinoid intermediate 2 (fig. 6) from the two approaches into the target cobyric acid required the introduction of the two missing methyl groups at the meso positions of the corrin chromophore between rings A/B and C/D, as well as the conversion of all peripheral carboxyl functions into their amide form, except the critical carboxyl at the ring-D f-side chain (see fig. 6). These steps were collaboratively explored in strictly parallel fashion in both laboratories, the Harvard group using material produced via the A/B approach, the ETH group such prepared by the photochemical A/D approach.

The first decisive identification of a totally synthetic intermediate on the way to cobyric acid was carried out in February 1972 with a crystalline sample of totally synthetic dicyano-cobalt(III)-hexamethyl-cobyrinate-f-amide 3 (fig. 6), found to be identical in all data with a crystalline relay sample made from vitamin B12 by methanolysis to cobester 4, followed by partial ammonolysis and separation of the resulting mixture. At the time when Woodward announced the "Total Synthesis of Vitamin B12" at the IUPAC conference in New Delhi in February 1972, the totally synthetic sample of the f-amide was one that had been made at ETH by the photochemical A/D approach, while the first sample of synthetic cobyric acid, identified with natural cobyric acid, had been obtained at Harvard by partial synthesis from B12-derived f-amide relay material. Thus, the Woodward/Eschenmoser achievement around that time had been, strictly speaking, two formal total syntheses of cobyric acid, as well as two formal total syntheses of the vitamin.

In the later course of 1972, two crystalline epimers of totally synthetic dicyano-cobalt(III)-hexamethyl-cobyrinate-f-amide 3, as well as two crystalline epimers of the totally synthetic f-nitrile, all prepared via both synthetic approaches, were stringently identified chromatographically and spectroscopically with the corresponding B12-derived substances. At Harvard, cobyric acid was then made also from totally synthetic f-amide 3 prepared via the A/B approach.

The publication record

Over the almost 12 years it took the two groups to reach their goal, both Woodward and Eschenmoser periodically reported on the stage of the collaborative project in lectures, some of them appearing in print. Woodward discussed the A/B approach in lectures published in 1968, and 1971, culminating in the announcement of the "Total Synthesis of Vitamin B12" in New Delhi in February 1972 published in 1973. This publication, and lectures with the same title Woodward delivered in the later part of the year 1972 are confined to the A/B approach of the synthesis and do not discuss the ETH A/D approach.

Eschenmoser had discussed the ETH contributions to the A/B approach in 1968 at the 22nd Robert A. Welch Foundation conference in Houston, as well as in his 1969 RSC Centenary Lecture "Roads to Corrins", published in 1970. He presented the ETH photochemical A/D approach to the B12 synthesis at the 23rd IUPAC Congress in Boston in 1971. The Zürich group announced the accomplishment of the synthesis of cobyric acid by the photochemical A/D-approach in two lectures delivered by PhD students Maag and Fuhrer at the Swiss Chemical Society Meeting in April 1972, Eschenmoser presented a lecture "Total Synthesis of Vitamin B12: the Photochemical Route" for the first time as Wilson Baker Lecture at the University of Bristol, Bristol/UK on May 8th, 1972.

As a joint full publication of the syntheses by the Harvard and ETH groups (announced in and expected in) had not appeared by 1977, an article describing the final version of the photochemical A/D approach already accomplished in 1972 was published 1977 in Science. This article is an extended English translation of one that had already appeared 1974 in Naturwissenschaften, based on a lecture given by Eschenmoser on January 21, 1974 at a meeting of the Zürcher Naturforschende Gesellschaft. Four decades later, in 2015, the same author finally published a series of six full papers describing the work of the ETH group on corrin synthesis. Part I of the series contains a chapter entitled "The Final Phase of the Harvard/ETH Collaboration on the Synthesis of Vitamin B12", in which the contributions of the ETH group to the collaborative work on the synthesis of vitamin B12 between 1965 and 1972 are recorded.

The entire ETH work is documented in full experimental detail in publicly accessible Ph.D. theses, almost 1'900 pages, all in German. Contributions of the 14 postdoctoral ETH researchers involved in the cobyric acid syntheses are mostly integrated in these theses. The detailed experimental work at Harvard was documented in reports by the 77 postdoctoral researchers involved, with a total volume of more than 3'000 pages.

Representative reviews of the two approaches to the chemical synthesis of vitamin B12 have been published in detail by A. H. Jackson and K. M. Smith, T. Goto, R. V. Stevens, K. C. Nicolaou & E. G. Sorensen, summarized by J. Mulzer & D. Riether, and G. W. Craig, besides many other publications where these epochal syntheses are discussed.

The Harvard/ETH approach to the synthesis of cobyric acid: the path to the common corrinoid intermediate via A/B-corrin-ring closure

In the A/B approach to cobyric acid, the Harvard A-D-component was coupled to the ETH B-C-component between rings D and C, and then closed to a corrin between rings A and B. Both these critical steps were accomplished by C,C-coupling via sulfide contraction, a new reaction type developed in the synthesis of the B-C-component at ETH. The A-D-component was synthesized at Harvard from a ring-A precursor (prepared from achiral starting materials), and a ring-D precursor prepared from (−)-camphor. A model A-D-component was used to explore the coupling conditions; this component differed from the A-D-component used in the final synthesis by having as the functional group at the ring-D f-side chain a methyl ester group (like all other side chains) instead of a nitrile group.

The ETH approach to the synthesis of cobyric acid: the path to the common corrinoid intermediate via A/D-corrin-ring closure

In the A/D approach to the synthesis of cobyric acid, the four ring precursors (ring-C precursor only formally so) derive from the two enantiomers of one common chiral starting material. All three vinylogous amidine bridges that connect the four peripheral rings were constructed by the sulfide contraction method, with the B-C-component  already prepared for the A/B-approach  serving as an intermediate. The photochemical A/D-secocorrin→corrin cycloisomerization, by which the corrin ring was closed between rings A and D, is a novel process, targeted and found to exist in a model study (cf. fig. 2).

ETH/Harvard: the jointly executed final steps from the common corrinoid intermediate to cobyric acid

The final steps from the common corrinoid intermediate E-37/HE-44 to cobyric acid E-44/HE-51 were carried out by the two groups collaboratively and in parallel, the ETH group working with material produced by the A/D approach, and the Harvard group with that from the A/B approach. What the two groups in fact accomplished thus were the common final steps of two different syntheses.

The tasks in this end phase of the project were the regioselective introduction of methyl groups at the two meso positions C-5 and C-15 of E-37/HE-44, followed by conversion of all its peripheral carboxyl functions into primary amide groups, excepting that in side chain f at ring D, which had to end up as free carboxyl. These conceptually simple finishing steps turned out to be rather complex in execution, including unforeseen pitfalls like a dramatic loss of precious synthetic material in the so-called "Black Friday" (July 9, 1971).

Notes

References

Total synthesis
Organocobalt compounds
Vitamin B12